St. Albert Transit (StAT) is the public transportation system in the city of St. Albert, Alberta, Canada, which is located about  northwest of downtown Edmonton. Scheduled bus service consists of local circuits within the community and express commuter routes to Edmonton. The city owns and maintains the vehicles but the drivers are privately contracted from Diversified Transportation.

Handibus is the accessible service for those who cannot use regular transit buses. They operate within the city limits or provide travel to Edmonton for work or education purposes. Customers must be registered to use the service and all trips must be booked ahead of time.

Facilities

Transit Garage
Address: 235 Carnegie Drive 
Coordinates: 
Functions: office, garage and vehicle maintenance, ticket and pass sales.

Renovations to the garage have been completed and it has been renamed the Dez Liggett Transit Facility.  Dez Liggett is the founding Director of Transit in St. Albert and worked there for over 23 years.

St. Albert Centre Exchange
Address: Rivercrest Cres
Coordinates:  
Functions: bus route terminus

Nakî Transit Centre & Park and Ride
Address: Campbell Road
Coordinates: 
Functions: bus route terminus and park and ride

Routes

Fleet

STAT is also testing electric accordion buses and will most likely purchase some.

Rebranding
In 2014, St. Albert Transit (StAT), as part of the overall City of St. Albert, underwent a logo and branding changeover. As of April 2014 the new branding is prevalent on almost all vehicles and transit facilities. StAT's new Handibus vehicles display the new colours and branding and the existing conventional vehicles will be changed over as budget permits and through vehicle attrition.

See also

 Fort Sask Transit
 Edmonton Transit Service
 Leduc Transit
 Strathcona County Transit
 Public transport in Canada

References

External links
 St. Albert Transit website
 History of Regional Transit at Edmonton, Alberta

Transit agencies in Alberta
Transport in St. Albert, Alberta
Bus transport in Alberta